La Liga Formation is a geologic formation Late Jurassic and Early Cretaceous age cropping out in Coquimbo Region, Chile. Rocks of the formation are andesites. Locally the rocks of the formation present epidote alteration. The iron ores of El Romeral mine are emplaced on La Liga Formation.

References

Geologic formations of Chile
Lower Cretaceous Series of South America
Late Jurassic South America
Mesozoic Chile
Geology of Coquimbo Region
Jurassic volcanism
Cretaceous volcanism